Brain is a surname.

Those bearing it include:
 Archie Brain (born 1942), British anaesthetist and inventor of the laryngeal mask
 Aubrey Brain (1893–1955), British French hornist
 Benjamin Brain (1753-1794), British boxer
 Brian Brain (born 1940), British cricketer
 Charles Kimberlin Brain (born 1931), South African paleontologist
 Dave Brain (1879-1959), American baseball player
 David Brain (born 1964), Zimbabwean cricketer
 Dennis Brain (1921-1957), British French hornist
 Errol Brain, New Zealand rugby player
 George Brain (1893-1969), Australian politician
 Jimmy Brain (1900-1971), British football player
 Jonny Brain (born 1983), British football goalkeeper
 Lester Brain (1903–1980), Australian air force office and airline executive
 Louis Brain (born 1982), English-Australian football player
 Marshall Brain (born 1961), American computer scientist and entrepreneur
 Matias Brain (born 1974), Chilean triathlete
 Peter Brain (born 1947), Australian bishop
 Russell Brain, 1st Baron Brain (1895–1966), British neurologist
Tega Brain, Australian-born digital artist and environmental engineer
 Terence Brain (born 1938), British bishop
 Terry Brain (born 1907), Australian rules football player
 Terry Brain Jr. (born 1938), Australian rules football player
 Terry Brain (animator) (born 1956), animator
 Tim Brain (born 1954), British police chief

See also 
 Brayne, another surname